Børning 2 is a 2016 Norwegian action-comedy directed by Hallvard Bræin, and produced by Filmkameratene. It is the sequel to Børning (2014).

Anders Baasmo Christiansen plays the main character, Roy Gundersen, who gets out of prison for participating in the illegal street race to Nordkapp. He is challenged to a new illegal winter race from Bergen to Murmansk in the north of Russia, but refuses, as he wants to focus on spending time with his daughter. But then he hears that his daughter is participating in the race together with her boyfriend.

The movie premiered on the 12th of October 2016. The script was written by Linn-Jeanette Kyed and Anne Elvedal, following the story by  Christopher Grøndahl.

A sequel, Børning 3, was filmed in Norway, Sweden, Denmark, and Germany that ended with a race in the world known race track Nürburgring.

Plot 
Roy gets out of jail after 2 years, for participating in the illegal street race to Nordkapp. He is determined on getting his life back on track. He has hit rock bottom, gone bankrupt, and in a desperate attempt on restoring his life and being a good role model for his daughter, Nina, he takes a job in a gas station.

Roy's pregnant girlfriend hosts a "out of jail"-party, where some of his old racing enemies shows up and challenges him to a new race. The race starts in Fosnavåg, going through Sweden and Finland, before ending up in Murmansk in north Russia. Roy wants to keep his sheets clean, and refuses to race. That is until he finds out that Nina is attending the race together with her boyfriend Charley, and he has to stop her.

The race is wild and tough, going over mountains, icy roads and frozen waters. The race becomes a chase between the racers and the police, who are doing what ever they can to stop them.

Cast

Reception

Box office 
Like the first film, Børning 2 became an immediate success in the Norwegian box office, selling over 55 000 tickets on the day of the premiere breaking the Norwegian record, and accumulating over 212 000 viewers the first 5 days of showing. The film ended up with over 383 000 views. The movie has an approximate total budget of $2,500,000.

Critical reception 

Børning 2 received mixed to positive reviews from the critics.

Birger Vestmo from NRK P3's Filmpolitiet praises the movie for its driving and stunts in the winter snow and ice. "The movie is well done visually, where the colourful cars are a great contrast to the snow white landscapes they are racing through". He rated the movie a 4 out of 6.

Morten Ståle Nilsen from VG.no says what the movie lacks in story and relationships, it makes up for in the driving scenes. "The sentimental side of the movie feels even more insecure than the previous movie, where it now is full of relationships it is hard to believe (including the central relationship between father and daughter)." Nilsen rated the movie a 4 out of 6.

The film reviewer from Dagbladet, Aksel Kielland, criticizes the movie for the way it portrays the female role in the movie. "It doesn't matter that the script is written by two women (Anne Elvedal and Linn-Jeanette Kyed) or that the bikini ladies from the first movie is gone - "Børning 2" is about as hostile to women as it is possible for commercial Norwegian entertainment to become in 2016.". With this he rates the movie a 2 out of 6.

Accolades 
Børning 2 has been nominated to 4 Amanda Awards, including the People's choice award, and 1 Kosmorama Award.

References

External links 
 
 Børning 2 - On Cineuropa.org
 Børning 2 - Behind the scenes video material - SF Studio Norge youtube channel

2010s action adventure films
2016 films
Norwegian auto racing films
Norwegian action films
Norwegian sequel films
2010s Norwegian-language films